Fatmir Besimi (born 18 November 1975) is a Macedonian politician and economist of Albanian ethnicity. He currently served for Minister of Finance in North Macedonia,  He also served twice as Minister of Economy (December 2004 - June 2006 and August 2008 - July 2011) then Minister of Defence (August 2011 - February 2013) and after that he was Deputy Prime Minister of the Government of  the Republic of Macedonia in charge of European Affairs (March 2013 - March 2016). In 2010 he was selected as one of the top European Ministers in the group of Young Global Leaders by World Economic Forum.

Education
Fatmir Besimi was born in Tetovo, North Macedonia. He attended school in Tetovo and studied Economics at the Ss. Cyril and Methodius University of Skopje. His research thesis was on the subject “Monetary and Exchange Rate Policy in the Republic of Macedonia during the Process of Accession to the European Union".
During his studies he was a scholar of the Fund for talented students of the Ministry of Education of Republic of Macedonia, as well as user of the joint scholarship of Staffordshire University, Great Britain and Open Society Institute, Hungary.

Views
Fatmir Besimi believes in peace and stability as the basis for a sustainable development. Globalization and integration are an imperative leading to a better quality of life through the increased competition, transparency and functional democracy. In that respect, he considers the Euro-Atlantic integrations as the best alternative for the future of the Republic of Macedonia and the Balkans. Besimi believes that the future rests solely in our hands, in our readiness to face the challenges and use our full potential in improving our living standard and the quality of life.

Career
In 2001 he worked in the Research Directorate in the National Bank of the Republic of Macedonia. From 2002 to 2003 he was Director of the Public Enterprise for Airport Services, after which he was selected as Vice-Governor of the National Bank of Republic of Macedonia. In December 2004 he was appointed Minister of Economy in the Government of the Republic of Macedonia. After completing his mandate as Minister of Economy he was engaged as an economist in the World Bank Office in Kosovo in 2007. In 2008 he received a second mandate as Minister of Economy. After the early parliamentary elections in 2011 he became the Minister of Defence in the Government of the Republic of Macedonia(the first minister from ethnical Albanian community in this position) and during that period he was a member of the National Security Council of the Republic of Macedonia. Since February 2013 Besimi was appointed as Deputy Prime Minister in charge for the European Affairs in the Government of the Republic of Macedonia..

Fatmir Besimi has an active university engagement through lectures in the field of economics and global development in the post-graduate studies in the University of South-Eastern Europe in Tetovo from 2008, upon which he previously held lectures in the University Riinvest in Pristina in 2007 . Besimi is the author of two books in the English language and several professional and academic articles in the field of economics and politics published in English, Albanian and Macedonian in journals in the Republic of Macedonia and abroad.

In the framework of his public and state functions, Besimi was leading several governmental projects and activities, such as: Business Environment Reform and Institutional Strengthening, project by the World Bank (2005-2010); Membership of the Republic of Macedonia in CEFTA (2006); Reforms in the energy sector, restructuring of the electricity company and privatization of the electricity distribution company (2004-2006); Founding of the International Renewable Energy Agency (2009); Chairing the Energy Community of South-Eastern Europe (2010) and other strategies, projects and activities, as well as signing over ten international agreements and protocols. As Minister of Defense he was participating in the adoption of the new formation of the Army of Republic of Macedonia in accordance with NATO standards, in the promotion of Smart Defense Concept in the regional cooperation as well as the adoption of the Defense Diplomacy Strategy, Communication Strategy, ARM Equal Representation Program (promotion of the equal representation of the ethnic communities as inclusive process promoting the diversity as advantage), Gender Equality Committee, transformation of the Military Museum in Museum for Peace, Defense and Security, establishment of “Gallery of Nobel Peace Prize Winners and ARM for Peace” and other initiatives.

Political activity
• Member of the Executive Committee of DUI, (2009-).

• Head of the Secretariat of Economic DUI, political party of Albanians in RM, (2009-)

• Team leader for the preparation of the Party Program of DUI in the Parliamentarian elections of 2011 in the Republic of Macedonia

• Team leader for the Economic Program of DUI, (2004-2006)

• Head of the Economic Council of DUI, (2002-2006)

International activity
• Signed tens of international agreements and protocols as  Minister of economy and Minister of Defence on behalf of the  Government of the Republic of Macedonia.

• Organizing and active participation in hundreds of international activities and initiatives, conferences, seminars and workshops on policy debates for economic issues in the last since the 1990s.

• As Minister of Economy, member of high country delegation headed by Prime Minister of the RM and President of the RM participating in bilateral official meetings with Heads of States (United States, Turkey, Albania, Kosovo, Slovenia, Croatia, Montenegro, Ukraine, Czech Republic, Austria, Bulgaria, Bosnia and Herzegovina etc.) and International Institutions (World Bank, International Monetary Fund, World Trade Organizations, World Economic Forum, UN, UNDP, UNCTAD, etc.)

• Head of delegation as Minister of Economy in bilateral official meetings with Ministers of Economy, Energy, Industry and Trade of the following countries: Albania, Austria, Bulgaria, Croatia, Czech Republic, France, Germany, Greece, Kosovo, Libya, Qatar, Serbia and Montenegro, Slovenia and Turkey.

• Head delegation as Minister of Defence in official meetings with Ministers of Defence, Peace and Security of many countries such as Albania, Austria, Bulgaria, Bosnia and Herzegovina, Croatia, Czech Republic, Denmark, France, Germany, Greece, Great Britain, Italy,  Kosovo, Libya, Montenegro, Norway, People's Republic of China, Serbia, Slovenia, Switzerland, Turkey and United States of America.

Affiliations
As stated in the report of the World Economic Forum, on the basis of professional achievements, exceptional leadership capabilities and dedication to the society thus far, on 12 March 2010 Fatmir Besimi was selected as a member in the elite company of 197 best “young global leaders” from 72 countries, out of a total of 5,000 candidates, first from the Republic of Macedonia and one of three European Ministers for 2010.

Publications

Books
•  Besimi, Fatmir  ‘Monetary and Exchange Rate Policy in Macedonia: Accession to the European Union’, LAP Lambert Academic Publishing,  (2009)

• ‘Barriers for Trade, Growth, Investments and Competition, Chesapeake Associates’, (co-author), Washington DC, (Sep 2001)

Academic articles
• ‘The Ohrid Peace Agreement and the challenges of integration into European Union:
Competitive and integrated economy with equal chances’, International Conference, The Ohrid Framework Agreement: Towards Macedonia’s Membership in the European Union and NATO, Skopje (21 June 2011)

• ‘Global Economic Crisis and the Challenges Facing the Republic of Macedonia, Crossroads: The Macedonian Foreign Policy Journal, Vol.2, No.1, Skopje, RM, (Jun-Oct 2009)

• ‘The Monetary Transmission Mechanism in Macedonia: Implications for Monetary Policy’, Besimi F., Pugh G. and N. Adnett, Working Paper 02-2006, Centre for Research on Emerging Economies, IESR, Staffordshire University, UK, (Jan 2006)

• ‘The Role of Exchange Rate Stability in a Small and Open Economy: the Case of the Republic of Macedonia’, Conference on Economic challenges and perspectives for the R. Macedonia, Macedonian Academy of Science and Arts, Skopje, RM, (Sep 2004)

• ‘Macroeconomic Consolidation of Macedonia after the Ohrid Framework Agreement: Contribution for Successful European Integration’, Conference on Post-Ohrid, Pre-Europe Macedonia, organised by the Southeast Studies Centre and the School for Slavic and Southeast Studies at the University College London, (27 February 2004)

• ‘Similarity of the Inflation Rates as Maastricht Criterion as Compared to the Different Levels of Productivity Growth in the Accession Countries’, Bulletin 11-12/2003, Ministry of Finance of the Republic of Macedonia, (Dec 2003)

• ‘Variability of the Foreign Exchange and the International Trade: the Experience of the Republic of Macedonia’, Economic researches IV/2003, National Bank of the Republic of Macedonia, (Dec 2003)

• ‘The Transmission Effect of the Foreign Exchange on the Monetary Strategy of the National Bank of the Republic of Macedonia’, (co-author), Economic researches II/2003, National Bank of the Republic of Macedonia, (Jun 2003)

• ‘Foreign Direct Investments in the Republic of Macedonia, Foreign Direct Investments in Kosovo’, RIINVEST Research Report, Pristina, (Sep 2002)

• ‘Entrepreneurship in Tetovo Region’, Economic Research Institute RIINVEST, Pristina, Workshop on Entrepreneurship and Business Planning, Ohrid, RM, (Jun 1999)

Journals, magazines, newspapers
• ‘Energy Community - a role model for EU integration’, EU Observer, http://euobserver.com/7/31604 (7 Jan 2011)

• ‘7 I-s for Development of Macedonia’, KAPITAL – Daily newspaper for economics and politics, RM, (31 December 2011)

• ‘The Western Balkans in the EU: To be or not to be?’, EU Observer, http://euobserver.com/7/31459 (9 Dec 2010)

• ‘Policies, Measures and Activities for Increasing the Competitiveness’, KAPITAL – magazine for economics and politics, RM, (Apr 2009)

• ‘Economic Suitability of Macedonia for joining the EU’, VALUTA - magazine for economics, RM (No.7, Sep 2007)

• ‘Euro Introduction with Respect to the Theory for Optimum Currency Areas’, VALUTA - magazine for economics, RM (No.6, Sep 2007)

• ‘Mixed Steps’, DNEVNIK – daily newspaper, RM, (28 April 2007)

• ‘Numbers Talk Differently’, FAKTI – daily newspaper, RM, (28 April 2007)

• ‘Nobel Prize for Inter-Generation Trade-off’, KAPITAL – magazine for economics and politics, RM, (9 November 2006)

• ‘Wrong Steps: Even the Best Economic Programs or Models are Determined to Failure if They are Based on Wrong Assumptions’, KAPITAL – magazine for economics and politics, RM, (5 October 2006)

• ‘The Economic Aspects of the Crisis in Macedonia’, LOBI - weekly newspaper, RM, (30 July 2001)

• ‘Macedonia – A hostage of the Middle Ages’ Balkan Prejudices’, KOHA DITORE - daily newspaper, Kosovo, (3 April 2001)

• ‘Interethnic Crisis in Macedonia: the International Factor as a Relevant Factor’, FAKTI - daily newspaper, RM, (3 April 2001)

• ‘Post-War Reconstruction of Kosovo: the Balkans should be liberated from the Partiality Syndrome’, FAKTI - daily newspaper, RM, (25 March 2000)

• ‘Telecommunications Transformation’, Economy and Business – monthly professional magazine, RM, (Mar 1999)

References

External links
 Faculty of Economics
 Staffordshire University

1975 births
Living people
Macedonian Muslims
People from Tetovo
Albanians in North Macedonia
Deputy Prime Ministers of North Macedonia
Government ministers of North Macedonia
Finance ministers of North Macedonia
Alumni of Staffordshire University
Democratic Union for Integration politicians
Ss. Cyril and Methodius University of Skopje alumni
21st-century Albanian politicians